Neomi Jehangir Rao (born March 22, 1973) is an American jurist who serves as a federal appellate judge on the U.S. Court of Appeals for the District of Columbia Circuit. She was appointed by President Donald Trump in 2019, having served in the Trump Administration from 2017 to 2019 as Administrator of the Office of Information and Regulatory Affairs.

Early life and education
Rao was born on March 22, 1973, in Detroit, Michigan, to Zerin and Jehangir Narioshang Rao. Rao's parents were Parsi physicians who immigrated to the United States from India in 1972. She grew up in Bloomfield Hills, Michigan, and attended Detroit Country Day School, graduating in 1991.

Rao studied ethics, politics & economics, and philosophy at Yale University, graduating in 1995 with a Bachelor of Arts, cum laude. From 1995 to 1996, Rao was a reporter for The Weekly Standard. She then attended the University of Chicago Law School, where she was a comment editor on the University of Chicago Law Review and executive editor of a symposium issue of the Harvard Journal of Law and Public Policy. She graduated in 1999 with a Juris Doctor with highest honors and Order of the Coif membership.

Career 
After law school, Rao clerked for judge J. Harvie Wilkinson III of the U.S. Court of Appeals for the Fourth Circuit from 1999 to 2000. She was legal counsel to the U.S. Senate Judiciary Committee from 2000 to 2001, then clerked for justice Clarence Thomas of the U.S. Supreme Court from 2001 to 2002.

In 2002, Rao entered private practice in London with the British law firm Clifford Chance, where she practiced public international law and arbitration. From 2005 to 2006, during the presidency of George W. Bush, Rao was an associate with the White House Counsel. In 2006, she became a professor of law at the George Mason University School of Law (now Antonin Scalia Law School), where she received tenure in 2012. In 2015, she founded the Center for the Study of the Administrative State.

She is a member of the Administrative Conference of the United States and the governing council of the American Bar Association's Section of Administrative Law and Regulatory Practice, where she co-chairs the section's regulatory policy committee. She is a member of the Federalist Society.

Office of Information and Regulatory Affairs
On April 7, 2017, President Donald Trump nominated Rao to become the administrator of the Office of Information and Regulatory Affairs (OIRA) within the Office of Management and Budget. Former OIRA Administrator Susan Dudley, who served under President George W. Bush, described Rao as "an excellent choice to lead OIRA...In addition to a sharp legal mind, she brings an openness to different perspectives and an ability to manage the competing demands of regulatory policy." 

Legal commentator and law professor Jonathan H. Adler wrote that "Trump's selection of Rao suggests the administration is serious about regulatory reform, not merely reducing high-profile regulatory burdens." Opposition to Rao came from groups such as the League of Conservation Voters (LCV), who said she has "led efforts to roll back fundamental environmental protections" and has "misuse[d] the regulatory review process for partisan political purposes." Rao was confirmed to the position by the United States Senate on July 10, 2017.

Federal judicial service

Nomination and confirmation 
On November 13, 2018, Trump announced that he would nominate Rao to the vacancy on the U.S. Court of Appeals for the D.C. Circuit created by Judge Brett Kavanaugh's elevation to the Supreme Court of the United States. Her nomination was sent to the Senate later that day. On January 3, 2019, her nomination was returned to the president under Rule XXXI, Paragraph 6, of the United States Senate. On January 23, 2019,  Trump announced his intent to renominate Rao for a federal judgeship. Her nomination was sent to the Senate later that day.

Rao's nomination attracted some opposition due to some of her college writing on race, sexual assault, and feminism. In response, Rao publicly apologized for some of these writings. Rao was criticized by disability rights activists such as Rebecca Cokley for a 2011 blog post where she expressed opposition to bans on dwarf-tossing. A hearing on her nomination before the Senate Judiciary Committee was held on February 5, 2019. Rao was asked by several Senators about her college writings, some of which they viewed as sexual assault victim blaming. Rao responded, "A victim of a horrible crime is not to blame and the person who commits those crimes should be held responsible."

Democrats expressed concern that rules Rao worked to repeal in her role as administrator of the White House Office of Information and Regulatory Affairs could face legal challenges and wind up before the D.C. Circuit Court of Appeals, which is considered the second most powerful appeals court. Rao said she would "look carefully at the standards for recusal, consult with her colleagues and follow the precedent and practices of the D.C. Circuit." Republican Senator Josh Hawley questioned whether she was sufficiently socially conservative regarding abortion rights but ultimately voted for her confirmation. On February 28, 2019, her nomination was reported out of committee by a 12–10 vote. On March 12, 2019, the Senate invoked cloture on her nomination by a 53–46 vote. On March 13, 2019, Rao was confirmed by a 53–46 vote. She received her judicial commission on March 18, 2019.

Notable opinions 
In an October 11, 2019, opinion of a three-judge panel of the United States Court of Appeals for the District of Columbia Circuit, Rao was the dissenter in a 2–1 ruling to affirm a district court ruling supporting a congressional subpoena for President Trump's records from the accounting firm Mazars. She wrote in her opinion that "allegations of illegal conduct against the president cannot be investigated by Congress except through impeachment."

Rao participated in the May 2020 appeal of Judge Emmet G. Sullivan's actions appointing amicus curiae in response to the Department of Justice moving to dismiss charges in United States v. Flynn. The Appeals Court initially ordered Judge Sullivan to file a response regarding the appeal within 10 days. On June 24, 2020, Rao wrote the 2–1 decision to dismiss the conviction of Flynn, joined by Judge Karen Henderson and with the dissent from Judge Robert Wilkins. Observers were surprised because Henderson had expressed skepticism over the government's position during the hearing. "I don't see why we don't observe regular order and allow him to rule," Henderson said. Flynn's lawyer, Sidney Powell, argued there was no longer any case or controversy, and the trial judge must dismiss the case against Flynn, at the request of the Trump Justice Department. After vacating the Rao decision, the full court heard the case on August 11, with many of the judges expressing skepticism about upholding the ruling. On August 31, 2020, the appeals court en banc ruled 8–2 in favor of denying the writ of mandamus, and not reassigning the case to a different district court judge, and remanded the case to Sullivan, with Judge Rao writing in dissent, joined by Henderson.

Personal life 
Rao is married to Alan Lefkowitz, a former law school classmate, with whom she has 2 children. After marrying her husband, Rao converted to Judaism, however she still identifies as a Zoroastrian.

See also
 List of Asian American jurists
 List of law clerks of the Supreme Court of the United States (Seat 10)

References

Selected publications

External links 

 
 
 Biography at Scalia Law School 
 The deep industry ties of Trump's deregulation teams
 

|-

1973 births
Living people
20th-century American women lawyers
20th-century American lawyers
21st-century American women lawyers
21st-century American lawyers
21st-century American judges
21st-century American women judges
Administrators of the Office of Information and Regulatory Affairs
American academics of Indian descent
American jurists of Indian descent
American Orthodox Jews
American people of Parsi descent
American Zoroastrians
Converts to Orthodox Judaism
Federalist Society members
George Mason University School of Law faculty
George W. Bush administration personnel
Judges of the United States Court of Appeals for the D.C. Circuit
Law clerks of the Supreme Court of the United States
Trump administration personnel
United States court of appeals judges appointed by Donald Trump
United States Senate lawyers
University of Chicago Law School alumni
Yale University alumni
Asian conservatism in the United States